Cherepish Ridge (Cherepishki Rid \che-re-'pish-ki 'rid\) is a narrow rocky  ridge in the South Shetland Islands of Antarctica. It was named after the Cherepish Monastery in the Iskar Gorge, Western Bulgaria.

Location
The ridge is located at which is 1.85 km north by northwest of Helmet Peak, 6.3 km east of Kuzman Knoll and 4.89 km southeast of Atanasoff Nunatak.

Bulgarian mapping in 2005 and 2009 from the Tangra 2004/05 topographic survey.

Maps
 L.L. Ivanov et al. Antarctica: Livingston Island and Greenwich Island, South Shetland Islands. Scale 1:100000 topographic map. Sofia: Antarctic Place-names Commission of Bulgaria, 2005.
 L.L. Ivanov. Antarctica: Livingston Island and Greenwich, Robert, Snow and Smith Islands. Scale 1:120000 topographic map.  Troyan: Manfred Wörner Foundation, 2009.

References
 Cherepish Ridge. SCAR Composite Gazetteer of Antarctica
 Bulgarian Antarctic Gazetteer. Antarctic Place-names Commission. (details in Bulgarian, basic data in English)

External links
 Cherepish Ridge. Copernix satellite image

Tangra Mountains
Ridges of Antarctica